A container format is a class of computer file formats that allow embedding multiple distinguishable data streams within a single file.  Container format may also refer to:

Recording format, for holding analog or digitally recorded data on a recording medium
Carrier signal format, for holding data during active wireless transmission
Multiplexing format, for combining data for active transmission

See also 
 Intermodal container